The NHL's Northeast Division was formed in 1993 as part of the Eastern Conference in a league realignment. Its predecessor was the Adams Division. The Northeast Division lasted for 19 seasons (not including the cancelled 2004–05 season) until the 2013 league realignment, when all five of its teams were placed into the new Atlantic Division.

Although none of its members won the Stanley Cup following the realignment until the Boston Bruins' title in 2011, its members accounted for a combined 43 Stanley Cup championships (24 by Montreal, 13 by Toronto and 6 by Boston), which was the most championships of any division in the NHL prior to 2013. In 2012, the Boston Bruins became the first team to win consecutive division titles.

Division lineups

1993–1995
 Boston Bruins
 Buffalo Sabres
 Hartford Whalers
 Montreal Canadiens
 Ottawa Senators
 Pittsburgh Penguins
 Quebec Nordiques

Changes from the 1992–93 season
 The Northeast Division is formed as a result of NHL realignment
 The Boston Bruins, Buffalo Sabres, Hartford Whalers, Montreal Canadiens, Ottawa Senators, and Quebec Nordiques come from the Adams Division
 The Pittsburgh Penguins come from the Patrick Division

1995–1997
 Boston Bruins
 Buffalo Sabres
 Hartford Whalers
 Montreal Canadiens
 Ottawa Senators
 Pittsburgh Penguins

Changes from the 1994–95 season
 The Quebec Nordiques relocate to Denver, Colorado, and become the Colorado Avalanche
 The Colorado Avalanche move to the Pacific Division

1997–1998
 Boston Bruins
 Buffalo Sabres
 Carolina Hurricanes
 Montreal Canadiens
 Ottawa Senators
 Pittsburgh Penguins

Changes from the 1996–97 season
 The Hartford Whalers relocate to Greensboro, North Carolina, and become the Carolina Hurricanes

1998–2013
 Boston Bruins
 Buffalo Sabres
 Montreal Canadiens
 Ottawa Senators
 Toronto Maple Leafs

Changes from the 1997–98 season
 The Carolina Hurricanes move to the Southeast Division
 The Pittsburgh Penguins move to the Atlantic Division
 The Toronto Maple Leafs come from the Central Division

After the 2012–13 season
The Northeast Division was dissolved as the league realigned into two conferences with two divisions each. All five teams were moved into the new Atlantic Division.

Division champions
 1994 – Pittsburgh Penguins (44–27–13, 101 pts)
 1995 – Quebec Nordiques (30–13–5, 65 pts)
 1996 – Pittsburgh Penguins (49–29–4, 102 pts)
 1997 – Buffalo Sabres (40–30–12, 92 pts)
 1998 – Pittsburgh Penguins (40–24–18, 98 pts)
 1999 – Ottawa Senators (44–23–15, 103 pts)
 2000 – Toronto Maple Leafs (45–27–7–3, 100 pts)
 2001 – Ottawa Senators (48–21–9–4, 109 pts)
 2002 – Boston Bruins (43–24–6–9, 101 pts)
 2003 – Ottawa Senators (52–21–8–1, 113 pts)
 2004 – Boston Bruins (41–19–15–7, 104 pts)
 2005 – no season (NHL lockout)
 2006 – Ottawa Senators (52–21–9, 113 pts)
 2007 – Buffalo Sabres (53–22–7, 113 pts)
 2008 – Montreal Canadiens (47–25–10, 104 pts)
 2009 – Boston Bruins (53–19–10, 116 pts)
 2010 – Buffalo Sabres (45–27–10, 100 pts)
 2011 – Boston Bruins (46–25–11, 103 pts)
 2012 – Boston Bruins (49–29–4, 102 pts)
 2013 – Montreal Canadiens (29–14–5, 63 pts)

Season results

Notes
 The 1994–95 NHL season was shortened to 48 games due to the lockout.
 The 2012–13 NHL season was shortened to 48 games due to the lockout.

Stanley Cup winners produced
 2011 – Boston Bruins

Presidents' Trophy winners produced
 2003 – Ottawa Senators
 2007 – Buffalo Sabres

Northeast Division titles won by team

References

NHL History

 
National Hockey League divisions